Heather Akosua Agyepong is a British photographer, visual artist and performer/actor, living in London.

Early life and education
Agyepong was born and raised in London and is of Ghanaian heritage.

She earned a National Diploma in Performing Arts from City of Westminster College; a BSc in Applied Psychology from the University of Kent; and an MA in Photography & Urban Cultures from Goldsmiths, University of London.

Work

In Wish You Were Here, commissioned by the Hyman Collection, Agyepong channels the American vaudeville performer Aida Overton Walker, by posing for a series of fake postcards. The work addresses physical and mental wellbeing.

The Body Remembers is a solo performance that "explores how trauma lives in the body, particularly for Black British women across different generations."

Collections
Agyepong's work is held in the following permanent collection:
Mead Art Museum, Amherst College, Amherst, Massachusetts

Group photography exhibitions
Starting Something New: Recent Contemporary Art Acquisitions and Gifts, Mead Art Museum, Amherst College, Amherst, Massachusetts, 2019–2021
Wish You Were Here, Format Festival, Derby, 2021

Awards and nominations
Jerwood Foundation New Work Fund award for The Body Remembers
2018: Nominated, South Bank Sky Arts Breakthrough Award
2021: Co-winner, with Joanne Coates, Jerwood/Photoworks Awards – a £15,000 award.

Filmography

Film

Television

Theatre

References

External links

21st-century British photographers
21st-century English people
21st-century English women
Actresses from London
Alumni of Goldsmiths, University of London
Alumni of the University of Kent
Artists from London
English women photographers
Living people
Photographers from London
Year of birth missing (living people)
Black British photographers
English people of Ghanaian descent